Putnamville is an unincorporated community in Warren Township, Putnam County, in the U.S. state of Indiana.

History
Putnamville was laid out in 1830. The community took its name from Putnam County. A post office called Putnamville has been in operation since 1832.

Geography

References

Unincorporated communities in Putnam County, Indiana
Unincorporated communities in Indiana